Uriah Tracy (1755–1807) was a U.S. Senator from Connecticut. Senator Tracy may also refer to:

Albert H. Tracy (1793–1859), New York State Senate
Erasmus Darwin Tracy (1810–1877), Florida State Senate
Jil Tracy (born 1973), Illinois State Senate
Jim Tracy (politician) (born 1956), Tennessee State Senate